Eleanor Stuart Allan is a former Scottish international female lawn bowler.

Bowls career
In 1995, she won the fours gold medal at the Atlantic Bowls Championships with Betty Forsyth, Frances Whyte and Liz Dickson.

Personal life
She was a Director of World Bowls from 2001 to 2012 and is a life member. She is also the Secretary for Bowls Scotland.

References

Living people
1937 births
Scottish female bowls players